Grevillea crassifolia is a species of flowering plant in the family Proteaceae and is endemic to the south-west of Western Australia. It is an open shrub with often thick, elliptic to oblong leaves and red flowers.

Description

Taxonomy
Grevillea crassifolia was first formally described in 1923 by Karel Domin in Vestnik Kralovske Ceske Spolecnosti Nauk, Trida Matematiko-Prirodevedecke from specimens collected by Arthur Dorrien-Smith. The specific epithet (crassifolia) means "thick-leaved".

Distribution and habitat
This grevillea grows in low shrubland in scattered populations on slopes in the Stirling Range National Park.

Conservation status
Grevillea crassifolia is listed as "not threatened" by the Government of Western Australia Department of Biodiversity, Conservation and Attractions.

See also
 List of Grevillea species

References

crassifolia
Proteales of Australia
Eudicots of Western Australia
Endemic flora of Western Australia
Plants described in 1923
Taxa named by Karel Domin